Nicholas Pileggi (born February 22, 1933) is an American author, producer and screenwriter. He wrote the non-fiction book Wiseguy and co-wrote the screenplay for Goodfellas, its 1990 film adaptation, for which he received a nomination for the Academy Award for Best Adapted Screenplay.

Early life
Pileggi was born and raised in Brooklyn, the elder son of an Italian immigrant father, Nicola ("Nick") Pileggi from Calabria and an American-born mother, Susie. Nicola "Nick" Pileggi was a musician who played slide trombone in a cinema orchestra for silent films; he subsequently also owned shoe stores.

In the 1950s, he worked as a journalist for Associated Press and New York magazine, specializing in crime reporting for more than three decades.

Career
Pileggi began his career as a journalist and had a profound interest in the Mafia. He is best known for writing Wiseguy: Life in a Mafia Family (1985), which he adapted into the movie Goodfellas (1990), and for writing Casino: Love and Honor in Las Vegas and the subsequent screenplay for Casino (1995). The movie versions of both were directed and co-written by Martin Scorsese. Pileggi also wrote the screenplay for the film City Hall (1996), starring Al Pacino. He served as an Executive Producer of American Gangster (2007), a biographical crime film based on the criminal career of Frank Lucas. He also authored Blye, Private Eye (1987).

Pileggi co-wrote the pilot of the CBS television series Vegas, which first aired in September 2012.

Personal life
Pileggi was married to fellow author, journalist, and filmmaker Nora Ephron from 1987 until her death in 2012.

Partial filmography

Books

References

External links

 
 Biography at Film Reference.com
 Fleeman, Mike, "Nora Ephron, Writer-Director of Sleepless in Seattle, Dies at Age 71" , People magazine, Tuesday June 26, 2012

1933 births
Best Adapted Screenplay BAFTA Award winners
Living people
American male screenwriters
American writers of Italian descent
Organized crime novelists
Organized crime memoirists
Non-fiction writers about organized crime in the United States
Film producers from New York (state)
People from Brooklyn
Male novelists
American male non-fiction writers
Screenwriters from New York (state)